Kathy Lee Peiss (born 1953) is an American historian. She is the Roy F. and Jeannette P. Nichols Professor of American History at The University of Pennsylvania. She is a fellow of the Society of American Historians.

Life 
Peiss received her BA from Carleton College in 1975, and her PhD from Brown University in 1982. Her research focuses on the history women in the workplace, the history of American sexuality, and gender. She is the author of Cheap Amusements: Working Women and Leisure in Turn-of-the-Century New York and Hope in a Jar: The Making of American Beauty Culture, a finalist for the Los Angeles Times Book Award. Peiss was awarded a Guggenheim Fellowship in 2002.

Work 
 Information Hunters: When Librarians, Soldiers, and Spies Banded Together in World War II Europe. New York: Oxford University Press, 2020. .
 Zoot Suit: The Enigmatic Career of an Extreme Style. Philadelphia: University of Pennsylvania, 2011. .
 Major Problems in the History of American Sexuality: Documents and Essays. Boston: Houghton Mifflin Co., 2002. .
 Hope in a Jar: The Making of American Beauty Culture.  Philadelphia: University of Pennsylvania Press, 1998. .
 Cheap Amusements: Working Women and Leisure in Turn-of-the-Century New York. Brown University, 1982. .

References

External links
 
 Kathy Peiss at  University of Pennsylvania, School of Arts & Sciences
 Peiss, Kathy. "American Women and the Making of Modern Consumer Culture." The Journal for MultiMedia History, Vol. 1, No. 1, Fall 1998.

1953 births
Living people
21st-century American historians
Carleton College alumni
Brown University alumni
University of Pennsylvania faculty
University of Pennsylvania historian